The Metropolitan Area Youth Symphony (MAYS) is a youth orchestra in the Central Florida region founded in honor of conductor and cellist, Jonathan May. The MAYS is led by Artistic Directors Maureen May and Michael Miller and features eight orchestral groups spanning beginner, intermediate and advanced skill levels, as well as several in-school strings programs. In 2015, MAYS added Dr. Chung Park, Director of Orchestras and String Music Education at the University of Central Florida, to the artistic staff as conductor of the Symphony. The MAYS currently rehearses at St. Alban's Anglican Church in Oviedo, Florida and Lake-Sumter State College in Leesburg, Florida.

History 

The founding of the MAYS occurred on May 1, 2010, which was designated by the government of Orange County, Florida as Mr. Jonathan May Day. The first Mr. Jonathan May Day celebration was held at Trinity Preparatory School on May 1, 2010, with the proclamation read live to the crowd by District Five Orange County Commissioner Bill Segal and presented to Maureen. The MAYS was founded to further the artistic and educational vision of Jonathan May. Since 1984, May followed his dream of bringing a well-rounded music education to thousands of young students of the Central Florida community. After his death in February 2010, the MAYS was formed under the executive direction of his daughter, Emily May, and artistic direction of his wife, Maureen May, a former Music Director at Millennium Middle School, strings teacher at Trinity Preparatory School, and cellist in the Orlando Philharmonic Orchestra and the Bach Festival, and close friend and colleague, Michael Miller, Director of Music Activities at The Geneva School, Artistic Director of the Central Florida Youth Orchestra, and former Associate Conductor of the Florida Young Artists Orchestra from 2000-2010.

The MAYS set out to continue Jonathan May's inclusive music educational philosophy, and states about him on the orchestra website: "The MAYS is dedicated to his honor and maintaining the high musical, educational, and ethical ideals that he brought with him to each of his orchestras and students.

During its first season, the MAYS held concerts at Knowles Memorial Chapel on the campus of Rollins College, First Presbyterian Church of Orlando, the Cathedral Church of Saint Luke, and collaborated with the Geneva School Rhetoric Choir, the Cathedral Choir, the Orlando Deanery Boy choir and Girls Choir, and Lake Howell High School's band and chorus as part of their Masterworks Series. The MAYS celebrated Jonathan May Day 2011 with its inaugural season finale concert that attracted hundreds and featured the world Premiere of Robert Kerr's "Elegy," dedicated to Susan Goldman and inspired by Jonathan May.

On May 14, 2011, many students of the MAYS joined onstage the Orlando Philharmonic Orchestra as they honored Jonathan May at its sellout final concert featuring violinist Joshua Bell.  The world premiere performance of the piece, Tall and Small, a commissioned work by Jonathan's brother, Daniel May, is named to reflect the wide impact May's passion for music had on children and adults alike.

After the conclusion of its second season, the MAYS absorbed the Central Florida Youth Orchestra in Leesburg.  It also began an in-school strings program called MAYS At Your School, which provides classroom instruction to students at schools in Eatonville, Florida, Mount Dora, Florida, and Leesburg, Florida.  The season concluded at the Bob Carr Performing Arts Centre in Orlando with all students performing at MAYSfest, adopted from CFYO's "Mayfest" concert to honor Jonathan May.  MAYSfest featured all MAYS students performing together onstage for the world premiere performance of "Mondo Rondo," a piece written by Daniel May for the MAYS.  MAYSfest has become an annual event for the MAYS, usually taking place around Jonathan May Day.
The 2012-2013 season also saw the formation of the 501(c)(3) organization, The Jonathan May Foundation, which was founded to support the students of the MAYS and further Jonathan May's educational ideals.

The MAYS currently has an enrollment of 250 students in nine Central Florida counties and celebrates it fifth season in 2014-2015.

Orchestras 

The MAYS comprises eight orchestras of over 250 students up to age 22 in two regions, MAYS of Orlando and MAYS of Lake County:

MAYS of Orlando

Symphony—The Symphony is the MAYS' most advanced full orchestra ensemble and rehearses and performs a vast array of standard orchestral repertoire.

Repertory Orchestra—The Repertory Orchestra is an intermediate full orchestra designed to nourish the musical abilities of students and help them develop skills to play in an ensemble reading off larger scores and with new sounds.

Intermezzo—The Intermezzo is an intermediate to advanced ensemble that provides a chamber setting for young string musicians to develop their ability to play with other string instruments, requiring a focused attention on tone, intonation, bow control and other aspects of string playing.

Concertino—The Concertino is an entry-level group for beginning string players and provides students with the opportunity to work closely with peers and instructors to learn the first levels of playing together and mastering the string instruments.

MAYS of Lake County

Chamber Symphony—The foundation of the Chamber Symphony is made of the most experienced strings students in Lake County. Other musical instrumentation is added to complement the selections being performed. This select group indicates a serious level of skill and dedication, and requires a focused attention to detail.

Lyric Consort—The Lyric Consort is for students at the advanced-beginning to the intermediate performance levels. This ensemble provides a chamber setting for young string musicians to develop their ability to play with other string instruments, requiring a focused attention on tone, intonation, bow control and other aspects of string playing. This ensemble is for the serious string player, and provides the opportunity for strong development as a string musician. Repertoire is chosen to specifically improved technique and to promote music appreciation.

Concert Strings—The Concert Strings is an entry-level group for beginning string players ages 9 and older and has been developed to help the budding string musicians learn to listen and play music with other string players. This ensemble provides students with the opportunity to work closely with peers and instructors to learn the first levels of playing together and mastering the string instruments.

String Explorers—String Explorers is a place for beginning musicians ages 5 to 8 that are learning the essentials of strings playing for the first time. Students work on techniques like how to play a string instrument, read music, and play in an ensemble. Emphasis is placed on instructing the new musician with basic techniques and fundamentals while learning to play in an ensemble.

MAYS At Your School is an innovative program of the Metropolitan Area Youth Symphony that works in partnership with local schools to provide youth orchestra opportunities to students in their own classrooms; currently MAYS is partnered with the Life Academy of Excellence in Eatonville, Florida, Gateway Christian School in Mount Dora, Florida, and St. Paul's Catholic School in Leesburg, Florida. With in-school instruction and performances each semester, students enjoy the experience and expertise of MAYS music teachers as they embark on their youth orchestra journey.

In addition to the orchestras, the MAYS conducts classes on music theory and composition, holds professional recitals and regular workshops with professional Central Florida musicians on a wide variety of topics.  The MAYS also holds concerto competitions judged by an independent panel that listens and scores students for the opportunity to perform their concerto with the MAYS orchestra.

References

External links 
 MAYS Home Page
 The Jonathan May Foundation
 Chung Park: Conductor
 The Life Academy of Excellence
 St. Paul's Catholic School

American youth orchestras
2010 establishments in Florida
Musical groups established in 2010
Orchestras based in Florida
Youth organizations based in Florida
Organizations based in Orlando, Florida
Music of Orlando, Florida